Caladenia verrucosa, commonly known as the mallee spider orchid, is a plant in the orchid family Orchidaceae and is endemic to south-eastern Australia. It is a ground orchid with a single, hairy leaf and usually only one greenish-yellow and red flower.

Description
Flowering occurs from September to October.

Taxonomy and naming
Caladenia verrucosa was first formally described in 1991 by Geoffrey Carr and the description was published in Indigenous Flora and Fauna Association Miscellaneous Paper 1. The specific epithet (verrucosa) is a Latin word meaning "full of warts".

Distribution and habitat
The mallee spider orchid is most common in north-western Victoria and south-eastern South Australia where it grows in mallee woodland in sandy soil. In New South Wales it occurs in between Griffith and Rankins Springs.

References 

verrucosa
Plants described in 1991
Endemic orchids of Australia
Orchids of Victoria (Australia)
Orchids of South Australia
Orchids of New South Wales
Taxa named by David L. Jones (botanist)